Kenny Drew and His Progressive Piano (also released as The Modernity of Kenny Drew) is a 12" LP record album by American jazz pianist Kenny Drew. It contains sessions recorded in 1953 and 1954 (some of which were originally released as a 10" LP The Ideation of Kenny Drew) and was released on the Norgran label.

Reception
The AllMusic review states: "[T]his disc is well worth acquiring for bop fans." The Billboard reviewer wrote that Drew "shows off some bright, modern stylings on a group of standards that should please cool collectors."

Track listing
All compositions by Kenny Drew except as indicated
 "Bluesville" - 5:24     
 "Angie" - 5:36     
 "I Can Make You Love Me" (Peter DeRose, Bob Russell) - 3:56     
 "My Beautiful Lady" - 5:36     
 "Many Miles Away" - 2:43     
 "52nd Street Theme" (Thelonious Monk) - 3:23     
 "I'll Remember April" (Gene DePaul Patricia Johnston, Don Raye) - 6:37     
 "Four and Five" (Byron Gay, Marco H. Hellman) - 3:15     
 "Polka Dots and Moonbeams" (Jimmy Van Heusen, Johnny Burke) - 4:18     
 "Lo Flame" - 3:36     
 "Chartreuse" - 4:31     
 "Kenny's Blues" - 5:57  
Recorded in New York City in 1953 (tracks 1-5 & 7) and Los Angeles on September 2, 1954 (tracks 6 & 8-12)

Personnel
Kenny Drew - piano
Gene Wright (tracks 1, 2 & 4-12) - double bass
Lawrence Marable (tracks 6 & 8-12), Charles "Specs" Wright (tracks 1, 2, 4, 5 & 7) - drums

References

Kenny Drew albums
1954 albums
Norgran Records albums
Albums produced by Norman Granz